Todo Maná: Grandes Exitos is a compilation album (eleventh overall) set by Latin American Mexican rock band Maná. This compilation was made in effort to promote to fans in Spain.

Track listing

Certifications

References

1999 greatest hits albums
Maná compilation albums